Calosoma splendidum is a species of ground beetle in the subfamily of Carabinae. It was described by the famous French entomologist Pierre François Marie Auguste Dejean in 1831, and is found in the Bahamas, the Dominican Republic and Haiti. It was also recorded from Guantánamo, Cuba, Floridian cities such as Chokoloskee, Deltona, and Key West. Besides the Caribbean and Florida, it was recorded from Clarke County, Georgia, Texas, and even the Yucatán Peninsula of Mexico. The color of the upper body of C. splendidum is uniformly green, golden-green or light brown with green luster. It is easily distinguished from any other species of the subgenus Calodrepa because of the absence of red border on the lateral margin of the elytra.

References

splendidum
Beetles described in 1831
Fauna of the Caribbean
Insects of the Dominican Republic